Donje Kolibe or Kolibe Donje is a village near Bosanski Brod in the municipality of Brod, Republika Srpska, Bosnia and Herzegovina. The settlement suffered great damage during the war, where it was almost completely destroyed. Most of the houses are still in ruins, and stay as a reminder of great destruction that took place. More than 12 years later, only a few houses were rebuilt. A new building stands on the place where the old church stood. Patron Saint of Parish Kolibe is Michael, who is celebrated on September 29. This is a day of reunion among people who once lived in the small village. A majority of inhabitants were ethnic Croats.

References

External links 
 Official Kolibe Donje link ( Croatian)

Villages in Republika Srpska
Populated places in Brod, Bosnia and Herzegovina
Villages in Bosnia and Herzegovina